Hastinapur Wildlife Sanctuary is a protected area in the Gangetic plains of Uttar Pradesh, India. This area has not enjoyed protection needed to check poaching and various other threats to wildlife due to lack of proper notification.

Geography
Tall wet grasslands dominate in low-lying areas and are inundated most of the year. Short wet grasslands are dry from winter to the onset of the monsoon. Dry scrub grasslands dominate on elevated alluvial deposition. Swamps and marshes are present between elevated grounds and the sandy bed of the Ganges. A large part of the sanctuary is settled and under cultivation. Sugarcane, rice, wheat, maize and cucurbits are the major cultivated crops.

The sanctuary is named for the ancient city of Hastinapur, which lies on west bank of the Boodhi Ganga.

Wildlife 

Mammal species recorded in Hastinapur Wildlife Sanctuary include swamp deer, smooth-coated otter, Ganges river dolphin, gharial. and Indian leopard, chital, sambar deer, nilgai.

Between 2009 and 2012, 494 gharials were released in the sanctuary.

Among the 117 bird species recorded are short-toed snake eagle, Egyptian vulture white-eyed buzzard, black-shouldered kite, black kite, shikra, Western marsh harrier, spotted owlet, Indian grey hornbill, painted stork, Asian open-billed stork, white-necked stork, black ibis, Indian peafowl, Sarus crane, Demoiselle crane, Eurasian spoonbill, purple heron, pond heron, black-crowned night heron, cattle egret, large egret, median egret, little egret, little grebe, bar-headed goose, lesser whistling duck, comb duck, cotton teal, gadwall, mallard, Indian spot-billed duck, Northern shoveller, ruddy shelduck, Northern pintail, garganey, common pochard, grey francolin, purple moorhen, common moorhen, white-breasted waterhen, common coot, black-winged stilt curlew sandpiper, pied avocet, pheasant-tailed jacana, bronze-winged jacana, rose-ringed parakeet, Indian roller, pied kingfisher, white-breasted kingfisher, Asian green bee-eater, blue-tailed bee-eater, coppersmith barbet, hoopoe, rufous-backed shrike, red-vented bulbul, small pratincole.

Save Sanctuary Movement
25 years ago it was notified as wildlife sanctuary to protect ecology, biodiversity of Ganga basin and conserve global, national, regional, state and local environment. It is important that steps are taken by the government to develop this area in the same way as they have developed Corbett National Park or the Ranthambore Wildlife Sanctuary and invite investment for development of hotel and other tourism related infrastructure inside the sanctuary area to encourage tourism. This will give lot of employment opportunities to the local population at the same time develop the area for wildlife tourism.

Industrial activities are generating air, water and noise pollution in the sanctuary, stone crushers, sugar mill, organics, paper mill, chemical industries, cotton mill, fiber unit, automobiles, rubber industries, brick bhattas and others polluted units are violating the acts openly. Large numbers are decreasing of wildlife as swamp deer, the Ganges dolphin, skimmer, leopard, crocodile and other IUCN Red Listed species because natural habitat damaged of indigenous species and those hunting.

To make a proper sanctuary, Greenman Vijaypal Baghel an environmental activist is fighting against hunting, illegal encroaching, tree cutting, sand mining, biodiversity destroying, violating of Wildlife Protection Act and other related guidelines since 2001. Paryawaran Sachetak Samiti and WWF have organized many activities to protect Hastinapur Wildlife Sanctuary.

Dr. Ravindra Shukla is an advocate, environmentalist, and animal rights activist, working with Smt. Meneka Sanjay Gandhi's organisation PFA for ten years to protect the sanctuary. He had lodged many FIR against animal smugglers, mining mafias, and wildlife smugglers. He is fighting against corrupt officials.

Reduction of the sanctuary's size 
Hastinapur Wildlife Sanctuary occupies an extremely large area spreading on both sides of river Ganga. Wildlife Institute of India (WII) officials say that the sanctuary should be reduced to half of its present area (1094 km2). They are saying so because the sanctuary comprises many agricultural fields that need to be excluded are the earliest, however many Wildlife activists feel that this is not good for the sanctuary and say that the agricultural part should be added in the buffer zone of the sanctuary and not be cut out of the sanctuary because if that is done, farmers will sell their lands to builders and then a town will be made outside the forest. Vijay Pal Baghel, who is popularly known as the green man of India said" For the past decade, the government has been trying to erase the sanctuary and when they couldn't do it, they will drastically reduce its size."

Location

By Air 
The nearest airport is Delhi, which is around 110 km away.

By Rail 
Nearest railhead is Meerut, which is 40 km from the sanctuary.

By BUS 
Hastinapur on National Highway No. 119 Delhi-Meerut-Pauri and is connected by road to all parts of the state.

See also 
 Haiderpur Wetland
 Wild life Sanctuaries in Uttar Pradesh

References

External links 
 "Hastinapur sanctuary", The Hindu
 "Hastinapur Sanctuary", indiaplaces.com

Wildlife sanctuaries in Uttar Pradesh
Meerut division
Tourist attractions in Meerut district
1986 establishments in Uttar Pradesh
Protected areas established in 1986